Edward Dougherty may refer to:

 Edward Emmett Dougherty (1876–1943), architect in the southeastern United States
 Edward R. Dougherty (born 1945), American mathematician and electrical engineer
 Eduardo Dougherty (Edward John Dougherty), American-Brazilian Jesuit priest and educator